Raimon Marchán Vidal is a Spanish professional footballer who plays as a defensive midfielder for Melbourne Victory.

He spent most of his career in the Segunda División B, totalling 194 games with six clubs. In 2021, he signed for Melbourne Victory in the A-League Men.

Football career

Spain
Born in Vilafranca del Penedès, Catalonia, Marchán was a Real Madrid CF youth product and made his senior debut on loan to CD Leganés in the Segunda División B in 2012. He played the following season with the capital club's C-team in the same division, ending in administrative relegation, and in 2015 he signed for another reserve team, Valencia CF Mestalla. After a year at Real Valladolid Promesas, he joined yet another third-tier second team in July 2017, signing for two years at Celta de Vigo B with the option of two more.

On 28 August 2019, Marchán signed for FC Andorra, again in the same division.

Melbourne Victory
On 27 July 2021, Marchán signed for Melbourne Victory FC in the Australian A-League Men. He was sent off on 5 December in a 3–0 home loss to Perth Glory FC, for a high challenge on Jonathan Aspropotamitis in first-half added time.

On 25 January 2022, in a game against Sydney FC at the Melbourne Rectangular Stadium, Marchán clashed heads with teammate Jason Geria and was taken off in a stretcher. His facial fractures caused him to eat less and drop five kilograms in weight from what he already described as a slender frame, requiring him to bulk up in order to be recalled by manager Tony Popovic. He made his comeback in his continental debut on 15 March, an AFC Champions League playoff lost 4–3 away to Japanese club Vissel Kobe. Having made 21 league appearances, he was given a two-year contract extension in June 2022.

Personal life
Marchán graduated from Universidad Camilo José Cela with a degree in business administration.

References

External links

Living people
1993 births
People from Vilafranca del Penedès
Spanish footballers
Footballers from Catalonia
Association football defenders
Segunda División B players
A-League Men players
CD Leganés players
Real Valladolid Promesas players
Celta de Vigo B players
FC Andorra players
Melbourne Victory FC players
Spanish expatriate footballers
Spanish expatriate sportspeople in Andorra
Spanish expatriate sportspeople in Australia
Expatriate footballers in Andorra
Expatriate soccer players in Australia